Hans Augusto (H. A.) Rey (né Reyersbach; September 16, 1898 – August 26, 1977) was a German-born American illustrator and author, known best for the series of children's picture books that he and his wife Margret Rey created about Curious George.

Life
Hans Augusto Reyersbach was born in Hamburg, German Empire on September 16, 1898. Hans and Margret were German Jews. The couple first met in Hamburg at Margret's sister's 16th birthday party.  They met again in Brazil, where Hans was working as a salesman of bathtubs and Margret had gone to escape the rise of Nazism in Germany. They married in 1935 and moved to Paris, France in August of that year.
They lived in Montmartre and fled Paris in June 1940 on bicycles, carrying the Curious George manuscript with them.

He died on August 26, 1977 in Cambridge, Massachusetts, United States.

Curious George

While in Paris, Hans' animal drawings came to the attention of a French publisher, who commissioned him to write a children's book. The characters in Cecily G. and the Nine Monkeys included an impish monkey named Curious George, and the couple then decided to write a book focused entirely on him. The outbreak of World War II interrupted their work. Being Jews, the Reys decided to flee Paris before the Nazis invaded the city. Hans assembled two bicycles, and they left the city just a few hours before it fell. Among the meager possessions they brought with them was the illustrated manuscript of Curious George.

The Reys' odyssey took them to Bayonne, France, where they were issued life-saving visas signed by Portuguese Vice-Consul Manuel Vieira Braga (following instructions from Aristides de Sousa Mendes) on June 20, 1940. They crossed the Spanish border, where they bought train tickets to Lisbon. From there they returned to Brazil, where they had met five years earlier, but this time they continued on to New York. The Reys escaped Europe carrying the manuscript to the first Curious George book, which was published in New York by Houghton Mifflin in 1941. Hans and Margret originally planned to use watercolor illustrations, but since they were responsible for the color separation, he changed these to the cartoon-like images that continue to be featured in each of the books. (A collector's edition with the original watercolors has since been released.)

Curious George was an instant success, and the Reys were commissioned to write more adventures of the mischievous monkey and his friend, the Man in the Yellow Hat. They wrote seven stories in all, with Hans mainly doing the illustrations and Margret working mostly on the stories, though they both admitted to sharing the work and cooperating fully in every stage of development. At first, however, covers omitted Margret's name. In later editions, this was changed, and Margret now receives full credit for her role in developing the stories. Curious George Takes a Job was named to the Lewis Carroll Shelf Award list in 1960.

The Reys relocated to Cambridge, Massachusetts during 1963, in a house near Harvard Square, and lived there until Hans's death in 1977.

In the 1990s, the Reys' friends founded a children's bookstore named Curious George & Friends (formerly Curious George Goes to Wordsworth), which operated in Harvard Square until 2011. A new Curious George themed store opened in 2012, The World's Only Curious George Store, which in 2019 moved to Central Square.

Star charts
Rey's interest in astronomy began during World War I and led to his desire to redraw constellation diagrams, which he found difficult to remember, so that they were more intuitive. This led to the 1952 publication of The Stars: A New Way to See Them,. His constellation diagrams were adopted widely and now appear in many astronomy guides, such as Donald H. Menzel's A Field Guide to the Stars and Planets. As of 2008 The Stars: A New Way to See Them, and a simplified presentation for children called Find the Constellations, are still in print. A new edition of Find the Constellations was released in 2008, updated with modern fonts, the new status of Pluto, and some more current measurements of planetary sizes and orbital radii.

Collected papers

The University of Oregon holds H. A. Rey papers dated 1940 to 1961, dominated by correspondence, primarily between Rey and his American and British publishers.

The de Grummond Children's Literature Collection in Hattiesburg, Mississippi, holds more than 300 boxes of Rey papers dated 1973 to 2002.

Dr. Lena Y. de Grummond, a professor in the field of library science at the University of Southern Mississippi, contacted the Reys in 1966 about USM's new children's literature collection. H. A. and Margret donated a pair of sketches at the time. When Margret Rey died in 1996, her will designated that the entire literary estate of the Reys be donated to the de Grummond Collection.

Books written by H. A. Rey
Cecily G. and the Nine Monkeys
Curious George
Curious George Takes a Job
Curious George Rides a Bike
Curious George Gets a Medal
Curious George Learns the Alphabet
Curious George Goes to the Hospital
Feed the Animals
Find the Constellations
Elizabite - Adventures of a Carnivorous Plant
How Do You Get There?
Pretzel
The Stars: A New Way to See Them
Where's My Baby?
See the Circus
Tit for Tat
Billy's Picture
Whiteblack the Penguin Sees the World
Au Clair de la Lune and other French Nursery Songs (1941)
Spotty (1945)
Mary had a Little Lamb and other Nursery Songs (1951)
Humpty Dumpty and other Mother Goose Songs (©1943 Harper & Brothers)

Books illustrated by H. A. Rey
 Dem Andenken Christian Morgensterns 12 Lithographien zu seinem Werk, von Hans Reyersbach (= H. A. Rey), signiert und mit Text in Bleistift HR 22 (1922)
 Die Sommerfrische: 10 Idyllen in Linol-Schnitt, von Hans Reyersbach (= H. A. Rey), Berlin  (1923)
 Grotesken - 12 Lithographien zu Christian Morgensterns Grotesken von Hans Reyersbach (= H. A. Rey). Neue Folge. 400 Exemplare, Hamburg Kurt Enoch Verlag (1923)
 Zebrology (1937)
 Elizabite - The Adventures of a Carnivorous Plant (1942)
 Don't Frighten the Lion (1942)
 Katy No-Pocket (1944)
 We Three Kings and other Christmas Carols (1944)
Curious George Flies a Kite, written by Margret Rey (1958)

References

Citations
 New York Times: "How Curious George Escaped the Nazis"
 A curious tale of George's creators
 Jaeger, Roland: "H. A. und Margret Rey", in: Spalek, John M. / Feilchenfeldt, Konrad / Hawrylchak, Sandra H. (ed.): Deutschsprachige Exilliteratur seit 1933, vol. 3, USA, part 2; Bern/München 2000, p. 351−360
 Jaeger, Roland: "Collecting Curious George. Children's Books Illustrated by H. A. Rey", in: Firsts. The Book Collector's Magazine, vol. 8, 1998, no. 12 (Dec.), p. 50–57
 Jaeger, Roland: "Der Schöpfer von 'Curious George': Kinderbuch-Illustrator H. A. Rey". in: Aus dem Antiquariat, 1997, No. 10, A543−A551

External links
 
 Margret and H. A. Rey Interactive Timeline: Life in Paris and a Narrow Escape
 Curious George Saves the Day: The Art of Margret and H. A. Rey, The Jewish Museum (New York), March 14, 2010 – August 1, 2010.
 
 See IMDB: Monkey Business: The Adventures of Curious George's Creators (2017)
 H.A. & Margret Rey Papers at the University of Southern Mississippi Libraries
H.A. & Margret Rey Digital Collections at the University of Southern Mississippi Libraries

1898 births
1977 deaths
Artists from Cambridge, Massachusetts
American academics of English literature
American children's book illustrators
American children's writers
German children's writers
German illustrators
German male writers
Curious George
Jewish American artists
Jewish American writers
Jewish emigrants from Nazi Germany to the United States
People associated with astronomy
Writers from Cambridge, Massachusetts
Writers from Hamburg
Writers who illustrated their own writing